is a Japanese footballer who currently plays for the Japan Soccer College.

Career statistics

Club

Notes

References

1993 births
Living people
Niigata University of Management alumni
Japanese footballers
Japanese expatriate footballers
Association football midfielders
Albirex Niigata Singapore FC players
Japan Soccer College players
Singapore Premier League players
Japanese expatriate sportspeople in Singapore
Expatriate footballers in Singapore